Pol Schmoetten (born May 17, 1958 in Dudelange) is a Luxembourgian writer. He won the Servais Prize in 2000 for his book Der Tag des Igels.

External links
Biography at the CNL (in Luxembourgish)

1958 births
Living people
Luxembourgian male writers
Alumni of the Athénée de Luxembourg
People from Dudelange